New Rochelle station is a Metro-North Railroad and Amtrak train station located in New Rochelle, New York. The station serves Metro-North's New Haven Line and Amtrak's Northeast Regional; Bee-Line Bus System buses serve a bus stop just outside the station. As of August 2006, weekday commuter ridership was 4,020, and there are 1,381 parking spots. It is the busiest New Haven Line station in Westchester County.

On October 14, 2009, it was listed on the National Register of Historic Places. The NRHP listing is limited to the historic station building and just the land underneath its roofline, as the pedestrian bridge elevators, track and other associated structure is all much newer and lack historical merit. The building was built in 1887 for the New York, New Haven, and Hartford Railroad. The architect of the building is unknown; it was built by George O. Hawes, a local builder. The building was remodeled in 1931.

History

On December 25, 1848 the first train steamed through New Rochelle, part of the New York and New Haven Railroad built in the early 1840s. At the time, New Rochelle was the final railroad station before entering New York City. A fatal head-on collision in New Rochelle in 1851 led to the construction of a second track in 1853. By 1869, six trains traveled between the two cities daily. NY&NH was consolidated into the New York, New Haven & Hartford Railroad a year later. In 1873, the railroad acquired the Harlem River and Port Chester Railroad and linked it to the station. In 1884, the railroad drew up plans for its present brick structure which was constructed in 1887 to replace the original Gothic Revival structure that had stood just northeast of what is now North Avenue.

The 1½ story station is built of brick and has a gabled roof punctuated by a series of hipped dormers. A centered hexagonal dormer projects away from the building to allow views along the tracks. Its eaves overhang beyond the exterior walls of the building, and is supported by unadorned wood brackets. The interior of the  still retains many original features. By the start of the 20th century, the New York, New Haven & Hartford Railroad had five tracks through New Rochelle. The population had surged to 15,000 inhabitants. A roundhouse for steam engines, tracks for passenger cars and a large freightyard near Cedar Street was built.

Over the years, New Rochelle became one of the busiest stations on the line. As it developed into a commuter town, local travel increased even more. The city obtained national fame in 1906 when George M. Cohan wrote the song entitled "Forty-five Minutes from Broadway". The average 36-minute train ride and 10-minute walk from Grand Central to Broadway places the station about 45 minutes away.

As with all New Haven Line stations in Westchester County, the station became a Penn Central station upon acquisition by Penn Central in 1969, and eventually became part of the MTA's Metro-North Railroad. On October 25, 1987, New Rochelle became eastern Westchester County's Amtrak station, replacing , which served as the county's eastern Amtrak station since 1972. The station was fully renovated in 1990, and careful attention was placed on restoring it to its original historical accuracy. The waiting room is reflective of New Haven line stations, with plaster walls, a wood ceiling and wood wainscot sheathing. The original floor was probably wood, but was replaced sometime in the 1930s with Terrazzo. There are wood moldings around the doors, and crown moldings enhance the perimeter at the ceiling line.

During 2021, a limited number of Acela trains stopped at New Rochelle station on weekends.

Intermodal Transportation Center

An increase in Metro-North and Amtrak ridership late in the 20th century caused a demand for additional parking. In 1994, the city launched a plan to create a transportation center, including a parking structure with bus and taxi connections. The parking garage has a capacity in excess of 900 cars, which is two and a half times the on-site parking capacity prior to its construction. On the ground level of the structure is a bus terminal, complete with a waiting area and ticket office. The center was designed to be home to long-distance bus carriers such as the Trailways Transportation System, however they have since moved out of the Center, back to a stop two blocks away on Main Street. Routes on the Westchester Bee-Line are still served here. Several taxi companies operate from the structure, and Connecticut Limousine provides service to regional airports. The center was completed in 2001 and is in active use. The old station and the new transportation center have been blended together to meet the needs of the growing commuter population while at the same time preserving historical and architectural integrity of the 1887 station house.

Station layout
The station has two high-level platforms. The north one is a nine-car-long side platform and the south one is an 8-car long island platform.

Bus list

The following bus routes serve the New Rochelle Transit Center area; the 60 local buses stop on Main Street and Church Street eastbound, and Huguenot Street and North Street westbound, south of the station.

References

Bibliography

External links

New Rochelle Amtrak/Metro-North Station (USA Rail Guide -- Train Web)
New Rochelle Station (The SubwayNut)
New Rochelle Transportation Center (Downtown New Rochelle Business District)
North Avenue entrance from Google Maps Street View

Metro-North Railroad stations in New York (state)
Amtrak stations in New York (state)
Stations on the Northeast Corridor
Stations along New York, New Haven and Hartford Railroad lines
Railway stations in Westchester County, New York
Bus stations in New York (state)
Railway stations on the National Register of Historic Places in New York (state)
Buildings and structures in New Rochelle, New York
Transit centers in the United States
National Register of Historic Places in Westchester County, New York
Railway stations in the United States opened in 1848